Georges Armand Vérez was born in Lille on 1 August 1877 and died on 17 January 1932.  He was a pupil of Louis-Ernest Barrias and Jules Coutan.  In 1905 he was runner-up for the annual Prix de Rome for sculpture. After the end of the 1914-1918 war he was mostly involved executing sculptural work on war memorials for which the demand was huge.

War memorials

Other works

References

1887 births
1932 deaths
Artists from Lille
20th-century French sculptors
French male sculptors